Triunia youngiana, commonly known as red nut or spice bush, is a shrub of the family Proteaceae native to New South Wales and Queensland.

References

Flora of Queensland
Flora of New South Wales
youngiana
Plants described in 1864
Taxa named by Ferdinand von Mueller